Anton Pierre (born 23 September 1977 in Port of Spain) is a football defender from Trinidad and Tobago. He began playing club football with St. Ann's Rangers before spending most of his career with Defence Force. He obtained 52 caps and scored 1 goal for the national team between 1996 and 2005. In May 2005 he was left out of the national team by new coach Leo Beenhakker, but he was called up as a standby player to the 2006 World Cup.

Clubs
 Defence Force

References

External links
Bio at socawarriors.net

1977 births
Living people
Trinidad and Tobago footballers
Association football defenders
Bristol Rovers F.C. players
Trinidad and Tobago international footballers
Defence Force F.C. players
St. Ann's Rangers F.C. players
TT Pro League players
2005 CONCACAF Gold Cup players